Mi Reflejo (English: My Reflection) is the second studio album and first Spanish-language album by American singer Christina Aguilera. It was released on September 12, 2000, as a joint effort between RCA Records and BMG U.S. Latin. After the commercial success of her debut studio album effort, Christina Aguilera (1999), Aguilera recorded her follow-up project during 2000. It includes five Spanish-language versions of tracks from her previous album,  in addition to four original compositions and two cover songs. The tracks were adapted and composed by Rudy Pérez who also produced the album.

In the United States, Mi Reflejo peaked at number-one on the Billboard Top Latin Albums and Latin Pop Albums charts where it spent 19 weeks at the top of both charts, becoming one of the longest albums to chart at number one. The album was the best-selling Latin pop album of 2000 and was certified 6× Platinum (Latin field) by the Recording Industry Association of America (RIAA). It reached number two in Argentina and Uruguay, as well as number five in Mexico, and has sold 2.2 million copies worldwide.

Upon its release, Mi Reflejo received generally mixed reviews from music critics, who noted musical similarities to Christina Aguilera. Despite this, the album achieved success, with Aguilera receiving the Latin Grammy Award for Best Female Pop Vocal Album and  two Billboard Latin Music Awards. Three singles were released from the album: "Ven Conmigo (Solamente Tú)", "Pero Me Acuerdo de Ti" and "Falsas Esperanzas". To promote the album, Aguilera extended her tour, Christina Aguilera in Concert, into 2001 for eight more dates and performed at the 43rd Annual Grammy Awards.

Background and composition 

According to her manager Steve Kurtz, Aguilera expressed interest in recording a Spanish-language album before she recorded her debut studio album Christina Aguilera. At the time, Aguilera was simultaneously touring to promote her debut album and recording a Christmas album My Kind of Christmas, released later in 2000. Mi Reflejo was intended to be titled Latin Lover Girl; the title's origin came from the Spanish version of the song "Reflection", which Aguilera recorded for the soundtrack to Mulan.

In 1999, she began recording in Miami with Cuban-American producer Rudy Pérez. He co-wrote the songs "Si No Te Hubiera Conocido", "Cuando No es Contigo", and "El Beso Del Final". He also composed the Spanish versions of "Come On Over Baby (All I Want Is You)" ("Ven Conmigo (Solamente Tú)"), "Genie in a Bottle" ("Genio Atrapado"), "I Turn to You" ("Por Siempre Tú"), "What a Girl Wants" ("Una Mujer"), and "Reflection" ("Mi Reflejo").  Aguilera covers Perez's song "Pero Me Acuerdo de Ti", which was originally performed by Puerto Rican singer Lourdes Robles on her album Definitivamente (1991). Pérez stated that Aguilera did not know any Spanish while recording; he remedied the problem by phonetically writing out lyrics and included a system that allowed Aguilera to pronounce the "r's" in the songs. Mi Reflejo features a cover of César Portillo de la Luz's bolero  "Contigo En La Distancia". Additionally, Aguilera made a duet with Puerto Rican singer Luis Fonsi on the ballad "Si No Te Hubiera Conocido". Aguilera wanted Fonsi to perform a duet with her because she felt that she could relate to him as they "grew up listening to the same things". "Cuando No es Contigo" is an uptempo salsa song which was arranged by Sergio George. "Falsas Esperanzas" is another uptempo song in the album which features Cuban musician Paquito Hechevarria performing the piano.

Reception

Critical reception

At Metacritic, which assigns a normalized rating out of 100 to reviews from mainstream critics, Mi Reflejo received an average score of 56, based on seven reviews, indicating "mixed or average reviews". Stephen Erlewine of AllMusic described the album as a mirror image of her debut album Christina Aguilera. He felt that it was a "little too familiar" although he praised recordings as "well-produced"; however, he concluded that the album  "doesn't add anything new to her music, since it's just the old music in new clothing." An editor for Billboard wrote that Aguilera has yielded a mostly mainstream pop album with Latin inflections. Eliseo Cardona of CDNow gave the album a mixed review. While he enjoyed Aguilera's vocal performance, which he described as " precisely, gracefully, forcefully ", he criticized the literal Spanish translation of the lyrics from English, which he said made a "good laugh and a better yawn". He commended "Cuando No es Contigo" as making Aguilera a "credible, expressive salsera" and her cover of "Contigo en la Distancia" as the album's finest moment.

David Browne of Entertainment Weekly, who gave the album a C rating, wrote the review in a parody memo from Aguilera's point of view. He mocked at Aguilera's attempt at making a Spanish-language album simply because of her Ecuadorian heritage, criticized her "unnecessary" high note", ballads that "old Latin ladies'll like", and the photos used in the album's booklet. Mike Magnuson of HOB.com wrote a critical review of the album admonishing the photos in the record for attempting to make Aguilera look Latino which he insisted was a bad influence for the younger audience. Though he mentions that "you can count on her agreeable voice" and lauded the use of Latin percussion and horns, he asserted that the record was "purely a marketing scam gone too far." Parry Gettelman from Orlando Sentinel stated that "Mi Reflejo lacks emotional depth, and her decision to record in Spanish seems more a bid to conquer new chart territory than anything else".

Sonicnet called its production "superslick" and compared Aguilera's vocals to that of Mariah Carey, completing that the album "almost guarantees that the diminutive diva will expand her colonial powers south of the border. In other words, she's planning to do a reverse Ricky Martin on us". Ernesto Lechner of the Los Angeles Times rated the album two out of four stars comparing her vocals in her debut album and in Mi Reflejo, describing her performance in the latter as "ridiculous". He complained about Aguilera's cover of "Contigo en la Distancia" which he described as a "bloated confection". Kurt B. Reighley from Wall of Sound wrote that the album is "an impressive addition to young Christina's limited canon".

Accolades

Promotion

To promote Mi Reflejo, Aguilera extended her tour, Christina Aguilera in Concert, into 2001 for eight more dates, visiting Mexico, Puerto Rico, Venezuela, Panama and Japan. Aguilera also gave a performance at the 2001 Grammy Awards, performing "Pero Me Acuerdo de Ti" and "Falsas Esperanzas".

Singles

The lead single of album was "Ven Conmigo (Solamente Tú)", the Spanish version of "Come On Over Baby (All I Want Is You)", which was released on August 8, 2000, to Latin radio stations. The song reached number-one on the Billboard Hot Latin Songs and number two on the Billboard Latin Pop Songs charts. It also peaked at number eight in Spain. The second single, "Pero Me Acuerdo de Ti" was released in December 2000. The song reached number eight on the Hot Latin Songs and number five on Latin Pop Songs charts. In Spain, it reached number three on the chart. Its music video was directed by Kevin G. Bray. The third single "Falsas Esperanzas" was released on July 3, 2001. The song reached number fifteen in Spain. Its music video, taken from her DVD My Reflection, was directed by Lawrence Jordan. "Genio Atrapado" and "Por Siempre Tú" were previously released as singles along with their original versions. The former single peaked at number thirteen on the Billboard Hot Latin Songs chart while the latter single peaked at number six on the Hot Latin Songs and number two on the Billboard Latin Pop Songs chart.

Legacy and achievements
In September 2018, Mi Reflejo was ranked number ten on the Billboard'''s Top 20 Latin Albums of All Time, and in 2020 the same media brand included it on its list of the longest-leading albums of all time on the Top Latin Albums chart (at number twelve). The album spent 19 weeks at number one on [[Billboard Top Latin Albums|Billboard's Top Latin Albums]] ranking at number 13 with the most weeks at number one. Mi Reflejo was best fifth best-selling Latin album of 2000 and became the second best-selling Latin album of the year later after Paulina by Paulina Rubio. The album was also the best-selling Latin pop album of 2000.

In a 2020 statement for Billboard, Aguilera noted that she "was excited to bring a new life to [the] songs and reinvent [them]". She added that she "was allowed to create and express new ad libs and vocal runs that [she] wasn't given the freedom to do on her original record". New York Daily News writer Muri Assuncão noted that after the release of the album, Aguilera went on to use "her Latin charm and sultry persona — not to mention her jaw-dropping four-octave vocal range — to become one of pop music's most beloved icons". In the 2021 article for POPline, it was noted that Mi Reflejo introduced Aguilera to the general public as a "fearless" and "versatile" artist, and also "played a pivotal role in the expansion of Spanish-language music within today's American pop scene."

Commercial performanceMi Reflejo debuted at number 27 on the US Billboard 200 selling nearly 43,000 copies in its first week. On the same week, the album debuted at number-one on the Billboard Top Latin Albums chart and replaced Son by Four's eponymous album. It spent nineteen weeks on top of the chart until was it replaced by Vicente Fernández for his greatest hits album Historia de un Idolo, Vol. 1. The album debuted at number one on the Billboard Latin Pop Albums chart where it succeeded Galería Caribe by Ricardo Arjona. It also spent nineteen weeks on top of this chart until it was replaced by Abrázame Muy Fuerte by Juan Gabriel. According to Nielsen SoundScan, it has sold 487,000 copies in the United States as of 2014. On September 10, 2001, the album was certified 6× Platinum in the Latin field for shipping 600,000 copies by the Recording Industry Association of America (RIAA).

Internationally, the album peaked at number two on the Argentine albums chart and was certified platinum by the Cámara Argentina de Productores de Fonogramas y Videogramas (CAPIF).  It also peaked at fifty-four in Switzerland and certified platinum in Mexico by the Asociación Mexicana de Productores de Fonogramas y Videogramas (AMPROFON). It reached number five on the official Mexican Albums Chart. In Spain, the album peaked at number twelve on the Spanish Albums Chart and was certified Platinum in the country for shipping 100,000 copies. Mi Reflejo was also commercially successful in Costa Rica where it sold more than 300,000 copies as of 2004. The album has sold 2.2 million copies worldwide as of 2006.

 Track listing 

Personnel
Adapted from the liner notes of Mi Reflejo''.
Musicians

 Christina Aguilera – vocals
 Richard Bravo – percussion
 Ed Calle – saxophone
 Tony Concepcion – trumpet
 Geannie Cruz – background vocals
 Luis Fonsi – performer
 David Frank – drums, keyboard
 Jerry Goldsmith – conductor
 John Goux – guitar
 Paquito Hechavarría – piano
 Julio Hernandez – bass
 Steve Kipner – drums, keyboard
 Matt Laug – tambourine
 Lee Levin – drums
 Manny Lopez – acoustic guitar
 Raúl Midón – background vocals
 Rafael Padilla – percussion
 Agustin Pantoja – palmadas
 Wendy Pederson – vocals
 Rudy Pérez – producer, arranger, songwriter, keyboards, Spanish guitar
 Clay Perry – keyboard, programming
 Tim Pierce – guitar
 Rubén Rodríguez – electric bass
 Michael C. Ross – keyboard
 Dana Teboe – trombone
 Michael Thompson – guitar
 Dan Warner – guitar
 Matthew Wilder – orchestration
 Aaron Zigman – orchestration

Production

 Producer: Rudy Pérez
 Executive producers: Ron Fair, Diane Warren
 Engineers: Paul Arnold, Bob Brockman, Mario DeJesús, Mike Greene, Mario Lucy, Joel Numa, Paul Rein, Michael C. Ross, Bruce Weeden
 Assistant engineers: Tom Bender, Michael Huff
 Mixing: Mike Couzzi, Mick Guzauski, Peter Mokran, Dave Way, Bruce Weeden
 Programming: Rudy Perez, Guy Roche, Michael C. Ross
 Drum programming: Rudy Perez
 Percussion programming: Rudy Pérez
 Arrangers: Rudy Perez, Ed Calle, David Frank, Sergio George, Ron Harris
 vocal arrangement: Ron Fair
 String arrangements: Gary Lindsay, Rudy Pérez
 Vocal arrangement: Rudy Pérez
 Orchestration: Matthew Wilder, Aaron Zigman

Charts

Weekly charts

Year-end charts

Decade-end charts

Certifications and sales

See also 
 2000 in Latin music
 List of number-one Billboard Top Latin Albums of 2000
 List of number-one Billboard Top Latin Albums of 2001
 List of number-one Billboard Latin Pop Albums from the 2000s
 List of best-selling Latin albums

References 

2000 albums
Christina Aguilera albums
Spanish-language albums
Albums produced by Rudy Pérez
Albums produced by Sergio George
Albums produced by Guy Roche
Albums produced by Matthew Wilder
Latin Grammy Award for Best Female Pop Vocal Album
Latin pop albums by American artists
RCA Records albums
World music albums by American artists